Day Book may refer to:

 The Day Book, a newspaper in Chicago 1911–1917
 Weekly Day Book, a newspaper which primarily existed to propagate white supremacist ideas, 1848–1879 
 General journal, or day book
a day book in bookkeeping

See also
 Diary, a record reporting on what has happened over the course of a day
 Commonplace book, a way to compile knowledge, usually by writing information into books